Clus Abbey (Kloster Clus) was an abbey near Bad Gandersheim in Lower Saxony. It was a daughter-house of  Gandersheim Abbey, having been founded in 1127 by Agnes, Abbess of Gandersheim, niece of the Emperor Henry IV, and was part of the Cluniac Reform movement.

History
In 1433 Abbot Johann Dederoth also became abbot of Bursfelde Abbey and initiated the Bursfelde Congregation. In this way Clus Abbey stands at the beginning of the great central European monastic reform and unification movement.

In the course of the Reformation the abbey was dissolved in 1596. The former library is now part of the Herzog August Bibliothek in Wolfenbüttel.

Abbey church
The former abbey church of Clus was built between 1127 and 1159 as a three-aisled basilica and shows some similarity to the abbey church at Gandersheim. In the choir, extended in the Gothic style in 1485, is a high altar which was brought here from Lübeck in 1487.

References
Heutger, Nicholas, 1975. Bursfelde und seine Reformklöster (2nd rev. ed.). Hildesheim: August Lax.

Benedictine monasteries in Germany
Monasteries in Lower Saxony
1120s establishments in the Holy Roman Empire
1127 establishments in Europe
Religious organizations established in the 1120s
Christian monasteries established in the 12th century